Oneida County Courthouse may refer to:

 Oneida County Courthouse (Idaho), Malad, Idaho
 Oneida County Courthouse (Wisconsin), Rhinelander, Wisconsin